The 2012–13 New York Knicks season was the 67th season of the franchise in the National Basketball Association (NBA). They clinched a playoff berth on March 22, 2013, with a win over the Toronto Raptors, and clinched the Atlantic division title on April 9 against the Washington Wizards.

In the playoffs, the Knicks defeated the Boston Celtics in six games in the first round, before falling to the Indiana Pacers in the conference semifinals in six games.

This was the Knicks' first Atlantic division title since the 1993–94 season, their highest win total since the 1996–97 season, their first 50-win season as well as the only time they advanced past the first round since the 1999–2000 season.

After this season, the Knicks would not return to the playoffs until the 2020–21 season.

Key dates
June 28: The 2012 NBA draft takes place at Prudential Center in Newark, New Jersey.
July 11: 2012 NBA Free Agency begins.

Draft picks

Roster

Standings

Division

Conference

Game log

Pre-season

|- style="background:#cfc;"
| 1
| October 11
| @ Washington
| 
| Steve Novak (21)
| Carmelo Anthony (5)
| Raymond Felton (8)
| Verizon Center9,627
| 1–0
|- style="background:#cfc;"
| 2
| October 13
| @ Boston
| 
| Carmelo Anthony (23)
| Three players (7)
| Raymond Felton (7)
| XL Center14,218
| 2–0
|- style="background:#fcc;"
| 3
| October 19
| @ Toronto
| 
| Carmelo Anthony (24)
| Carmelo Anthony (6)
| Pablo Prigioni (5)
| Bell Centre22,114
| 2–1
|- style="background:#fcc;"
| 4
| October 20
| @ Boston
| 
| Chris Copeland (34)
| Chris Copeland, Mychel Thompson (6)
| Pablo Prigioni (9)
| Times Union Center
| 2–2
|- style="background:#fcc;"
| 5
| October 22
| @ Philadelphia
| 
| Carmelo Anthony, Raymond Felton (23)
| Tyson Chandler (11)
| Raymond Felton, Jason Kidd (4)
| Carrier Dome8,831
| 2–3
|- style="background:#cfc;"
| 6
| October 24
| @ Brooklyn
| 
| Chris Copeland (16)
| Carmelo Anthony (9)
| Pablo Prigioni (11)
| Nassau Coliseum15,957
| 3–3

Regular season

|- style="background:#cfc;"
| 1 || November 2 || Miami
| 
| Carmelo Anthony (30)
| Carmelo Anthony (10)
| Raymond Felton (9)
| Madison Square Garden19,033
| 1–0
|- style="background:#cfc;"
| 2 || November 4 || Philadelphia
| 
| Carmelo Anthony (27)
| J.R. Smith (9)
| Jason Kidd (6)
| Madison Square Garden19,033
| 2–0
|- style="background:#cfc;"
| 3 || November 5 || @ Philadelphia
| 
| Carmelo Anthony (21)
| Ronnie Brewer (10)
| Raymond Felton (8)
| Wells Fargo Center15,783
| 3–0
|- style="background:#cfc;"
| 4 || November 9 || Dallas
| 
| Carmelo Anthony (31)
| Tyson Chandler (9)
| Raymond Felton (9)
| Madison Square Garden19,033
| 4–0
|- style="background:#cfc;"
| 5 || November 13 || @ Orlando
| 
| Carmelo Anthony (25)
| Carmelo Anthony (8)
| Raymond Felton (5)
| Amway Center18,846
| 5–0
|- style="background:#cfc;"
| 6 || November 15 || @ San Antonio
| 
| Raymond Felton (25)
| Carmelo Anthony (12)
| Raymond Felton (7)
| AT&T Center18,581
| 6–0
|- style="background:#fcc;"
| 7 || November 16 || @ Memphis
| 
| Carmelo Anthony (20)
| Chandler & Smith (7)
| Raymond Felton (5)
| FedEx Forum17,516
| 6–1
|- style="background:#cfc;"
| 8 || November 18 || Indiana
| 
| Carmelo Anthony (26)
| Anthony & Chandler (9)
| Raymond Felton (8)
| Madison Square Garden19,033
| 7–1
|- style="background:#cfc;"
| 9 || November 20 || @ New Orleans
| 
| Carmelo Anthony (29)
| Tyson Chandler (12)
| Raymond Felton (6)
| New Orleans Arena13,705
| 8–1
|- style="background:#fcc;"
| 10 || November 21 || @ Dallas
| 
| Carmelo Anthony (23)
| Tyson Chandler (13)
| Raymond Felton (11)
| American Airlines Center20,157
| 8–2
|- style="background:#fcc;"
| 11 || November 23 || @ Houston
| 
| Carmelo Anthony (37)
| Tyson Chandler (7)
| Raymond Felton (8)
| Toyota Center18,038
| 8–3
|- style="background:#cfc;"
| 12 || November 25 || Detroit
| 
| Carmelo Anthony (29)
| J.R. Smith (10)
| Raymond Felton (10)
| Madison Square Garden19,033
| 9–3
|- style="background:#fcc;"
| 13 || November 26 || @ Brooklyn
| 
| Carmelo Anthony (35)
| Carmelo Anthony (13)
| Raymond Felton (5)
| Barclays Center17,732
| 9–4
|- style="background:#cfc;"
| 14 || November 28 || @ Milwaukee
| 
| Carmelo Anthony (29)
| Anthony & Chandler (8)
| Felton & Prigioni (7)
| Bradley Center11,439
| 10–4
|- style="background:#cfc;"
| 15 || November 30 || Washington
| 
| Anthony & Smith (20)
| Tyson Chandler (10)
| J.R. Smith (6)
| Madison Square Garden19,033
| 11–4

|- style="background:#cfc;"
| 16 || December 2 || Phoenix
| 
| Carmelo Anthony (34)
| Tyson Chandler (13)
| Raymond Felton (7)
| Madison Square Garden19,033
| 12–4
|- style="background:#cfc;"
| 17 || December 5 || @ Charlotte
| 
| Carmelo Anthony (23)
| Tyson Chandler (17)
| Raymond Felton (9)
| Time Warner Cable Arena18,097
| 13–4
|- style="background:#cfc;"
| 18 || December 6 || @ Miami
| 
| Raymond Felton (27)
| Tyson Chandler (9)
| Raymond Felton (7)
| American Airlines Arena19,740
| 14–4
|- style="background:#fcc;"
| 19 || December 8 || @ Chicago
| 
| Raymond Felton (27)
| Tyson Chandler (18)
| Raymond Felton (5)
| United Center21,852
| 14–5
|- style="background:#cfc;"
| 20 || December 9 || Denver
| 
| Carmelo Anthony (34)
| Tyson Chandler (12)
| Jason Kidd (7)
| Madison Square Garden19,033
| 15–5
|- style="background:#cfc;"
| 21 || December 11 || @ Brooklyn
| 
| Carmelo Anthony (45)
| Tyson Chandler (7)
| Raymond Felton (7)
| Barclays Center17,732
| 16–5
|- style="background:#cfc;"
| 22 || December 13 || L. A. Lakers
| 
| Carmelo Anthony (30)
| Jason Kidd (9)
| Raymond Felton (8)
| Madison Square Garden19,033
| 17–5
|- style="background:#cfc;"
| 23 || December 15 || Cleveland
| 
| Raymond Felton (25)
| Tyson Chandler (10)
| Jason Kidd (8)
| Madison Square Garden19,033
| 18–5
|- style="background:#fcc;"
| 24 || December 17 || Houston
| 
| Chris Copeland (29)
| Tyson Chandler (18)
| Pablo Prigioni (5)
| Madison Square Garden19,033
| 18–6
|- style="background:#cfc;"
| 25 || December 19 || Brooklyn
| 
| Carmelo Anthony (31)
| Tyson Chandler (12)
| Jason Kidd (5)
| Madison Square Garden19,033
| 19–6
|- style="background:#fcc;"
| 26 || December 21 || Chicago
| 
| Carmelo Anthony (29)
| J.R. Smith (10)
| Kidd, Felton & Prigioni (3)
| Madison Square Garden19,033
| 19–7
|- style="background:#cfc"
| 27 || December 23 || Minnesota
| 
| Carmelo Anthony (33)
| Tyson Chandler (9)
| J.R. Smith (7)
| Madison Square Garden19,033
| 20–7
|- style="background:#fcc;"
| 28 || December 25 || @ L. A. Lakers
| 
| Carmelo Anthony (34)
| Tyson Chandler (9)
| Jason Kidd (7)
| Staples Center18,997
| 20–8
|- style="background:#cfc;"
| 29 || December 26 || @ Phoenix
| 
| J.R. Smith (27)
| Tyson Chandler (12)
| Jason Kidd (8)
| US Airways Center15,153
| 21–8
|- style="background:#fcc;"
| 30 || December 28 || @ Sacramento
| 
| J.R. Smith (28)
| Tyson Chandler (18)
| Pablo Prigioni (9)
| Sleep Train Arena16,407
| 21–9

|- style="background:#fcc;"
| 31 || January 1 || Portland
| 
| Carmelo Anthony (45)
| J.R. Smith (11)
| J.R. Smith (5)
| Madison Square Garden19,033
| 21–10
|- style="background:#cfc;"
| 32 || January 3 || San Antonio
| 
| Carmelo Anthony (23)
| Tyson Chandler (14)
| Pablo Prigioni (9)
| Madison Square Garden19,033
| 22–10
|- style="background:#cfc;"
| 33 || January 5 || @ Orlando
| 
| Carmelo Anthony (40)
| Tyson Chandler (12)
| Jason Kidd (7)
| Amway Center19,171
| 23-10
|- style="background:#fcc;"
| 34 || January 7 || Boston
| 
| J.R. Smith (24)
| Tyson Chandler (17)
| Jason Kidd (6)
| Madison Square Garden19,033
| 23-11
|- style="background:#fcc;"
| 35 || January 10 || @ Indiana
| 
| J.R. Smith (25)
| Tyson Chandler (15)
| J.R. Smith (6)
| Bankers Life Fieldhouse16,568
| 23-12
|- style="background:#fcc;"
| 36 || January 11 || Chicago
| 
| Carmelo Anthony (39)
| Tyson Chandler (18)
| Pablo Prigioni (8)
| Madison Square Garden19,033
| 23–13
|- style="background:#cfc;"
| 37 || January 13 || New Orleans
| 
| Carmelo Anthony (27)
| Tyson Chandler (18)
| Jason Kidd (8)
| Madison Square Garden19,033
| 24–13
|- style="background:#cfc;"
| 38 || January 17 || @ Detroit
| 
| Carmelo Anthony (26)
| Tyson Chandler (14)
| Anthony, Kidd, & Smith (4)
| The O2 Arena, London18,689
| 25-13
|- style="background:#fcc;"
| 39 || January 21 || Brooklyn
| 
| Carmelo Anthony (29)
| Tyson Chandler (11)
| Carmelo Anthony (7)
| Madison Square Garden19,033
| 25-14
|- style="background:#cfc;"
| 40 || January 24 || @ Boston
| 
| Carmelo Anthony (28)
| Anthony & Stoudemire (9)
| Pablo Prigioni (4)
| TD Garden18,624
| 26-14
|- style="background:#fcc;"
| 41 || January 26 || @ Philadelphia
| 
| Carmelo Anthony (25)
| Tyson Chandler (10)
| Carmelo Anthony (4)
| Wells Fargo Center20,540
| 26-15
|- style="background:#cfc;"
| 42 || January 27 || Atlanta
| 
| Carmelo Anthony (42)
| Amar'e Stoudemire (8)
| Raymond Felton (10)
| Madison Square Garden19,033
| 27-15
|- style="background:#cfc;"
| 43 || January 30 || Orlando
| 
| Tyson Chandler (21)
| Anthony & Chandler (7)
| Raymond Felton (9)
| Madison Square Garden19,033
| 28-15

|- style="background:#cfc;"
| 44 || February 1 || Milwaukee
| 
| Carmelo Anthony (25)
| Tyson Chandler (20)
| Raymond Felton (8)
| Madison Square Garden19,033
| 29–15
|- style="background:#cfc;"
| 45 || February 2 || Sacramento
| 
| J.R. Smith (25)
| Tyson Chandler (20)
| Raymond Felton (8)
| Madison Square Garden19,033
| 30–15
|- style="background:#cfc;"
| 46 || February 4 || Detroit
| 
| Carmelo Anthony (27)
| Tyson Chandler (20)
| Raymond Felton (9)
| Madison Square Garden19,033
| 31–15
|- style="background:#fcc;"
| 47 || February 6 || @ Washington
| 
| Carmelo Anthony (31)
| Tyson Chandler (13)
| Raymond Felton (4)
| Verizon Center18,263
| 31–16
|- style="background:#cfc;"
| 48 || February 8 || @ Minnesota
| 
| Carmelo Anthony (36)
| Carmelo Anthony (9)
| Kidd, Prigioni & Smith (4)
| Target Center16,542
| 32–16
|- style="background:#fcc;"
| 49 || February 10 || L. A. Clippers
| 
| Carmelo Anthony (42)
| Tyson Chandler (11)
| Raymond Felton (5)
| Madison Square Garden19,033
| 32–17
|- style="background:#fcc;"
| 50 || February 13 || Toronto
| 
| J.R. Smith (26)
| Carmelo Anthony (12)
| Raymond Felton (5)
| Madison Square Garden19,033
| 32–18
|- align="center"
|colspan="9" bgcolor="#bbcaff"|All-Star Break
|- style="background:#fcc;"
| 51 || February 20 || @ Indiana
| 
| Tyson Chandler (19)
| Tyson Chandler (11)
| Pablo Prigioni (8)
| Bankers Life Fieldhouse16,123
| 32–19
|- style="background:#fcc;"
| 52 || February 22 || @ Toronto
| 
| Carmelo Anthony (32)
| Chandler & Kidd (7)
| Anthony, Kidd, & Smith (4)
| Air Canada Centre19,800
| 32–20
|- style="background:#cfc;"
| 53 || February 24 || Philadelphia
| 
| Carmelo Anthony (29)
| Tyson Chandler (12)
| Pablo Prigioni (5)
| Madison Square Garden19,033
| 33–20
|- style="background:#cfc;"
| 54 || February 27 || Golden State
| 
| Carmelo Anthony (35)
| Tyson Chandler (28)
| Carmelo Anthony (8)
| Madison Square Garden19,033
| 34–20

|- style="background:#cfc;"
| 55 || March 1 || @ Washington
| 
| Carmelo Anthony (30)
| J.R. Smith (12)
| Jason Kidd (5)
| Verizon Center20,308
| 35–20
|- style="background:#fcc;"
| 56 || March 3 || Miami	
| 
| Carmelo Anthony (32)
| J.R. Smith (12)
| Jason Kidd (6)
| Madison Square Garden19,033
| 35–21 
|- style="background:#cfc;"
| 57 || March 4 || @ Cleveland
| 
| Amar'e Stoudemire (22)
| Tyson Chandler (9)
| Raymond Felton (10)
| Quicken Loans Arena19,784
| 36–21
|- style="background:#cfc;"
| 58 || March 6 || @ Detroit
| 
| Raymond Felton (26)
| Tyson Chandler (11)
| Jason Kidd (6)
| The Palace of Auburn Hills16,181
| 37–21
|- style="background:#fcc;"
| 59 || March 7 || Oklahoma City
| 
| J.R. Smith (36)
| Kidd, Chandler (10)
| Felton, Kidd, & Smith (3)
| Madison Square Garden19,033
| 37–22
|- style="background:#cfc;"
| 60 || March 9 || Utah
| 
| J.R. Smith (24)
| Tyson Chandler (9)
| Raymond Felton (4)
| Madison Square Garden19,033
| 38–22
|- style="background:#fcc;"
| 61 || March 11 || @ Golden State
| 
| Chris Copeland (15)
| Carmelo Anthony (10)
| Raymond Felton (4)
| Oracle Arena19,596
| 38–23
|- style="background:#fcc;"
| 62 || March 13 || @ Denver
| 
| Iman Shumpert (20)
| Chris Copeland (6)
| J.R. Smith (8)
| Pepsi Center19,155 
| 38–24
|- style="background:#fcc;"
| 63 || March 14 || @ Portland
| 
| J.R. Smith (33)
| Marcus Camby (10)
| Pablo Prigioni (5)
| Rose Garden20,636
| 38–25
|- style="background:#fcc;"
| 64 || March 17 || @ L. A. Clippers
| 
| J.R. Smith (17)
| Kenyon Martin (9)
| Raymond Felton (9)
| Staples Center19,412 
| 38–26
|- style="background:#cfc;"
| 65 || March 18 || @ Utah
| 
| J.R. Smith (20)
| Kenyon Martin (9)
| Jason Kidd (5)
| EnergySolutions Arena18,494
| 39–26
|- style="background:#cfc;"
| 66 || March 20 || Orlando
|  
| J.R. Smith (22)
| Carmelo Anthony (8)
| Pablo Prigioni (5)
| Madison Square Garden19,033 
| 40–26
|- style="background:#cfc;"
| 67 || March 22 || @ Toronto
| 
| Carmelo Anthony (37)
| Kenyon Martin (11)
| Felton, Kidd, Shumpert, & Smith (3) 
| Air Canada Centre19,800
| 41–26
|- style="background:#cfc;"
| 68 || March 23 || Toronto
|  
| Carmelo Anthony (28)
| Carmelo Anthony (8)
| Pablo Prigioni (6)
| Madison Square Garden19,033 
| 42–26
|- style="background:#cfc;"
| 69 || March 26 || @ Boston
|  
| J.R. Smith (32)
| Carmelo Anthony (8)
| Pablo Prigioni (5)
| TD Garden18,624 
| 43–26
|- style="background:#cfc;"
| 70 || March 27 || Memphis
|  
| J.R. Smith (35)
| Carmelo Anthony (7)
| Raymond Felton (4)
| Madison Square Garden19,033 
| 44–26
|- style="background:#cfc;"
| 71 || March 29 || Charlotte
| 
| J.R. Smith (37)
| Carmelo Anthony (11)
| Iman Shumpert (5)
| Madison Square Garden19,033
| 45–26
|- style="background:#cfc;"
| 72 || March 31 || Boston
| 
| Carmelo Anthony (24)
| J.R. Smith (12)
| Pablo Prigioni (5)
| Madison Square Garden19,033
| 46–26

|- style="background:#cfc;"
| 73 || April 2 || @ Miami
|  
| Carmelo Anthony (50)
| Kenyon Martin (6)
| Raymond Felton (9)
| American Airlines Arena20,300 
| 47–26
|- style="background:#cfc;"
| 74 || April 3 || @ Atlanta
| 
| Carmelo Anthony (40)
| Kenyon Martin (9)
| Jason Kidd (7)
| Philips Arena17,404
| 48–26
|- style="background:#cfc;"
| 75 || April 5 || Milwaukee
| 
| Carmelo Anthony (41)
| Carmelo Anthony (14)
| Felton & Prigioni (4)
| Madison Square Garden19,033
| 49–26
|- style="background:#cfc;"
| 76 || April 7 || @ Oklahoma City
| 
| Carmelo Anthony (36)
| Carmelo Anthony (12)
| Raymond Felton (8)
| Chesapeake Energy Arena18,203
| 50–26
|- style="background:#cfc;"
| 77 || April 9 || Washington
| 
| Carmelo Anthony (36)
| Chris Copeland (9)
| Raymond Felton (8)
| Madison Square Garden19,033
| 51–26
|- style="background:#fcc;"
| 78 || April 11 || @ Chicago
| 
| Carmelo Anthony (36)
| Carmelo Anthony (19)
| Raymond Felton (6)
| United Center22,464
| 51–27
|- style="background:#cfc;"
| 79 || April 12 || @ Cleveland
| 
| Anthony & Smith (31)
| Carmelo Anthony (14)
| Pablo Prigioni (4)
| Quicken Loans Arena19,430
| 52–27
|- style="background:#cfc;"
| 80 || April 14 || Indiana
| 
| Carmelo Anthony (25)
| J.R. Smith (8)
| Jason Kidd (5)
| Madison Square Garden19,033
| 53–27
|- style="background:#fcc;"
| 81 || April 15 || @ Charlotte
| 
| Chris Copeland (32)
| Copeland, Novak, & White (7)
| Pablo Prigioni (8)
| Time Warner Cable Arena15,238
| 53–28
|- style="background:#cfc;"
| 82 || April 17 || Atlanta
| 
| Chris Copeland (33)
| Earl Barron (18)
| Iman Shumpert (8)
| Madison Square Garden19,033
| 54–28

Playoffs

|- style="background:#cfc;"
| 1
| April 20
| Boston
| 
| Carmelo Anthony (36)
| Kenyon Martin (9)
| Raymond Felton (6) 
| Madison Square Garden19,033
| 1–0
|- style="background:#cfc;"
| 2
| April 23
| Boston
| 
| Carmelo Anthony (34)
| Kenyon Martin (11)
| Pablo Prigioni (5)
| Madison Square Garden19,033
| 2–0
|- style="background:#cfc;"
| 3
| April 26
| @ Boston
| 
| Carmelo Anthony (26)
| Chandler & Shumpert (8)
| Raymond Felton (10)
| TD Garden18,624
| 3–0
|- style="background:#fcc;"
| 4
| April 28
| @ Boston
| 
| Carmelo Anthony (36)
| Iman Shumpert (12)
| Raymond Felton (3)
| TD Garden18,624
| 3–1
|- style="background:#fcc;"
| 5
| May 1
| Boston
| 
| Carmelo Anthony (22)
| Tyson Chandler (11)
| Raymond Felton (4)
| Madison Square Garden19,033 
| 3–2
|- style="background:#cfc;"
| 6
| May 3
| @ Boston
| 
| Carmelo Anthony (21)
| Tyson Chandler (12)
| Raymond Felton (7)
| TD Garden18,624 
| 4–2

|- style="background:#fcc;"
| 1
| May 5
| Indiana
| 
| Carmelo Anthony (27)
| Carmelo Anthony (11)
| Pablo Prigioni (6)
| Madison Square Garden19,033  
| 0–1
|- style="background:#cfc;"
| 2
| May 7
| Indiana
| 
| Carmelo Anthony (32)
| Carmelo Anthony (9)
| Kidd & Prigioni (4)
| Madison Square Garden19,033
| 1–1
|- style="background:#fcc;"
| 3
| May 11
| @ Indiana
| 
| Carmelo Anthony (21)
| Iman Shumpert (10)
| Pablo Prigioni (4)
| Bankers Life Fieldhouse18,165
| 1–2
|- style="background:#fcc;"
| 4
| May 14
| @ Indiana
| 
| Carmelo Anthony (24)
| Tyson Chandler (10)
| Raymond Felton (6)
| Bankers Life Fieldhouse18,165
| 1–3
|- style="background:#cfc;"
| 5
| May 16
| Indiana
| 
| Carmelo Anthony (28)
| Tyson Chandler (8)
| Raymond Felton (4)
| Madison Square Garden19,033
| 2–3
|- style="background:#fcc;"
| 6
| May 18
| @ Indiana
| 
| Carmelo Anthony (39)
| J.R. Smith (10)
| Felton & Prigioni (6)
| Bankers Life Fieldhouse18,165
| 2–4

Player statistics

|- align="center" bgcolor=""
|  || 67 || 67 || 37.0 || .451 || .384|| .830|| 6.9 || 2.6 || 0.77|| 0.48 || 28.7
|- align="center" bgcolor="#f0f0f0"
| || 24 || 4 || 10.4 || .321 || .000 || .421 || 3.3 || 0.6 || 0.29 || 0.58 || 1.8
|- align="center" bgcolor="#f0f0f0"
| || 66 || 66 || 32.8 || .637 || .000 || .694 || 10.7 || 0.9 || 0.64 || 1.14 || 10.4
|- align="center" bgcolor=""
|  || 56 || 13 || 15.4 || .478 || .425 || .778|| 1.4|| 2 || 0.4 || 0.16 || 7.4
|- align="center" bgcolor="#f0f0f0"
| || 68 || 68 || 34.0 || .425 || .353 || .789 || 2.8 || 5.5 || 1.42 || 0.18 || 14.0
|- align="center" bgcolor=""
|  || 76 || 48 || 26.9 || .379 || .358 || .833 || 4.2 || 3.30 || 1.67|| 0.33 || 6.2
|- align="center" bgcolor="#f0f0f0
|  || 18 || 11 || 23.9 || .602 || .000 || .425 || 3.3 || 0.4 || 0.89 || 0.94 || 7.2
|- align="center" bgcolor=""
|   || 81 || 1 || 20.3 || .414 || .424 || .938 || 2.0 || 0.4 || 0.37 || 0.10 || 6.6
|- align="center" bgcolor="#f0f0f0"
| || 78 || 18 || 16.2 || .440 || .376 || .909 || 1.8 || 3.0 || 0.90 || 0.01 || 3.3
|- align="center" bgcolor=""
|  || 45 || 45 || 22.1 || .378 || .411 || .686 || 2.6 || 1.4 || 1.03 || 0.12 || 6.1
|- align="center" bgcolor="#f0f0f0"
|  || 80 || 0 || 33.5 || .415 || .352 || .785 || 5.1 || 2.7 || 1.27 || 0.31 || 17.7
|- align="center" bgcolor=""
|  || 29 || 0 || 23.5 || .577 || .000 || .808 || 5.0 || 0.4 || 0.34 || 0.72 || 14.2
|- align="center" bgcolor="#f0f0f0"
| || 39 || 17 || 10.1 || .542 || 1.000 || .462 || 2.3 || 0.5 || 0.26 || 0.41 || 2.5
|- align="center" bgcolor=""
| || 21 || 0 || 14.1 || .388 || .324 || .700 || 4.2 || 0.3 || 0.65 || 0.75 || 7.2
|- align="center" bgcolor="#f0f0f0"
| || 57 || 16 || 7.6 || .420 || .345 || .429 || 0.7 || 0.4 || 0.18 || 0.06 || 1.8
|- align="center" bgcolor=""
|}

Awards, records, and milestones

Awards

Week/Month

On December 3, 2012 Carmelo Anthony was named the Eastern Conference Player of the week for November 26 to December 2.
On April 1, 2013 J.R. Smith was named the Eastern Conference Player of the week for March 25 to April 1.
On April 8, 2013 Carmelo Anthony was named the Eastern Conference Player of the week for April 1 to April 7.
On April 15, 2013 Carmelo Anthony was named the Eastern Conference Player of the week for April 8 to April 14, his second consecutive (3rd overall) week winning the award.

All-Star

Carmelo Anthony was voted as a starter to the 2013 NBA All-Star Game (6th Selection).
Tyson Chandler was voted as a reserve to the 2013 NBA All-Star Game (1st Selection).

Records

Carmelo Anthony set a franchise record of 31 consecutive games played with 20+ points, lasting from November 16 against the Grizzlies and ending on February 2 against the Kings.
Tyson Chandler tied the franchise record (previously set by Willis Reed in 1969) of 3 consecutive games played with 20+ rebounds against the Bucks, Kings, and Pistons in games played on February 1 through February 4.
Carmelo Anthony tied the franchise record of 5 consecutive games played with 35+ points (previously set by Bernard King in 1985) in games played April 2 through April 9.
The Knicks tied the franchise record of 20 3-point shots made in a game on April 9 against the Washington Wizards.
After the Knicks beat the Oklahoma City Thunder on April 7, coach Mike Woodson improved to 68-32 as  Knicks head coach, the best 100 game mark in franchise history.
The Knicks set new NBA records of 891 3-point shots made and 2371 3-point shots attempted in a season.

Milestones

On February 8, 2013 Jason Kidd broke the 12,000 career assist mark against the Minnesota Timberwolves.

Transactions

Overview

Free Agency

Trades

See also
 2012–13 NBA season

Notes
 The Knicks started off 6–0, their best start since the 1993–94 season.
 The Knicks went 11–4 in November, the first time they won 11 games in a month since March 2000.
 The Knicks went 12–6 in March, the first time they won 12 games in a month since March 1994.
 The Knicks won 50 games for the first time since the 1999–2000 season.
 The Knicks won the Atlantic Division title for the first time since the 1993–94 season.
 The Knicks had a 13-game winning streak from March 18 to April 9, the third longest in franchise history, and the longest since the 1993–94 season had a 15-game winning streak.

References

New York Knicks seasons
New York Knicks
New York Knicks
New York Knicks
2010s in Manhattan
Madison Square Garden